Dickey's Barbecue Pit is an American family-owned barbecue restaurant chain based in Dallas, Texas, and is a subsidiary of Dickey's Capital Group.

Since Travis Dickey established the restaurant in 1941, it has become the largest barbecue franchise in the United States.

History
In 1941, Travis Dickey founded Dickey's Barbecue Pit in Dallas, Texas (Original location: 4610 N Central Expy, Dallas, TX, which is still in operation as of 2017). The restaurant began franchising in 1994. Roland Dickey Jr. was appointed CEO of the restaurant chain in 2006. Technomic named Dickey's Barbecue Pit the "Fastest-growing restaurant chain in the country" in 2012. That year, QSR Magazine included Dickey's Barbecue Pit on its list of "Best Franchise Deals."

Dickey's Barbecue Pit established its Barbecue, Boots & Badges Foundation, a charity foundation for law enforcement officers and firefighters, in November 2014. Fast Casual included the restaurant on its list of "Top 100 Movers and Shakers: Restaurants" in May 2014.

In 2015, Ernst & Young recognized Roland Dickey Jr. as Entrepreneur Of The Year Award Winner in the Southwest Region.

In 2017, Laura Rea Dickey was named chief executive officer of Dickey's Barbecue Pit, and falls under the umbrella of Dickey's Capital Group, the parent company of the Dickey's Barbecue Pit brand.

In 2018, the company opened its first international location at the Yas Mall in Abu Dhabi, United Arab Emirates. This location resulted from a franchising deal with operator Serenity Hospitality, based in Abu Dhabi. In a collaborative effort, the company and Dickey's customized its menu for locals, adding offerings such as smoked lamb and beef sausages. The second international location opened in Dubai in March 2019.

The first Dickey's Barbecue Pit in Singapore opened in its Central Business District in March 2021. The franchise is a ghost kitchen concept in the Central Kitchen Co., a contactless food court across from the city's Cross Street Exchange.

In April 2021, the chain expanded to Japan, starting in Tokyo, with plans to open a restaurant in every major city in the country. The Tokyo restaurant is located in the Kamiosaki District of Shinagawa-ku and offers limited dine-in seating as well as takeout and third-party delivery. It will be operated by the Japan Barbecue Franchise Company's owner, Sunsheng (Jason) Lin.

In April 2022, the chain expanded into Canada, starting in Edmonton, Alberta. The restaurant offers a wide variety of Halal options and is owned by local entrepreneurs Mohammed Hussain and Sadia Khan.

Key people
 Laura Rea Dickey, Chief Executive Officer
 Jay Rooney, Chief Financial Officer
 Renee Roozen, Chief Administrative Officer

Operations
Dickey's Barbecue Pit is a fast-casual restaurant that serves beef brisket, pulled pork, pork ribs, Polish sausage, spicy cheddar sausage, hot link and chicken. The restaurant chain smokes its meat on-site over hickory wood-burning pits. Additionally, Dickey's Barbecue Pit serves home-style sides including fried okra, jalapeño beans, green beans with bacon, waffle iron fries, barbecue beans, Caesar or garden salad, macaroni and cheese, corn on cob, and onion tanglers. The same recipes have been used since the restaurant was established in 1941.

Franchising
The restaurant began franchising in 1994. By January 2017, Dickey's Barbecue Pit Franchise had more than 483 restaurant locations in 43 states. The restaurant hosts "Barbecue U," an intensive, three-week session for franchise owners and operators. Dickey's Barbecue Pit customizes franchise restaurants based on location.

Dickey's differentiates its franchise from other restaurant franchise companies by offering what it calls "six revenue streams", listing them as: Dine-In, Catering, Online Ordering, Outside Delivery, Retail Items, and Holiday Meals.

See also
 List of barbecue restaurants

References

External links
 
 Dickey's BBQ Franchise – the franchise company website

American companies established in 1941
Barbecue restaurants in the United States
Franchises
Restaurant chains in the United States
Restaurant franchises
Restaurants established in 1941
1941 establishments in Texas
Family-owned companies of the United States